Santiago Bernabéu (formerly Lima) is a metro station on Line 10 of the Madrid Metro. It is located in fare Zone A. It is located next to the Real Madrid's Santiago Bernabéu Stadium.

The station was opened on 10 June 1982, shortly before the 1982 FIFA World Cup, which Spain were hosting. The station was originally called Lima (after the public square nearby), but took on its current name on 18 December 1997.

References

Line 10 (Madrid Metro) stations
Railway stations in Spain opened in 1982